The 2015–16 season was the 94th season of competitive association football and 79th season in the Football League played by York City Football Club, a professional football club based in York, North Yorkshire, England. Their 18th-place finish in 2014–15 meant it was their fourth successive season in League Two. The 2015–16 season ran from 1 July 2015 to 30 June 2016.

Russ Wilcox made six permanent summer signings, as he approached his first full season as York manager. In October 2015, Wilcox was sacked with York 21st in the table, following a nine-match run without a win. He was replaced by former Dundee United manager Jackie McNamara in November 2015. However, York never ranked higher than 22nd place under McNamara, and were relegated into the National League after finishing bottom of the 24-team 2015–16 League Two. They lost in their opening round match in the 2015–16 FA Cup, and were eliminated in the second round of the League Cup and the Northern section quarter-final of the Football League Trophy.

42 players made at least one appearance in nationally organised first-team competition, and there were 18 different goalscorers. Goalkeeper Scott Flinders missed only three of the 51 first-team matches over the season. Vadaine Oliver finished as leading scorer with 10 goals, of which seven came in league competition, one came in the FA Cup and two came in the Football League Trophy. The winner of the Clubman of the Year award, voted for by the club's supporters, was defender Dave Winfield.

Background and pre-season

The 2014–15 season was Nigel Worthington's second start to a season as manager of York City, having taken charge in March 2013. Worthington resigned in October 2014 with York one place above the relegation zone. He was replaced by Russ Wilcox, who had led Scunthorpe United to promotion from League Two last season before being sacked with them struggling in League One. York secured safety from relegation with more than two weeks of the season remaining, and finished in 18th place in the 2014–15 League Two table.

Ahead of 2015–16, York released Wes Fletcher, Ryan Jarvis, Lewis Montrose and Daniel Parslow, while Jason Mooney left for Accrington Stanley. Josh Carson, Michael Ingham and Tom Platt were retained with new contracts. York made nine summer signings, those being goalkeeper Scott Flinders from Hartlepool United, defenders Taron Hare and Eddie Nolan from Scunthorpe United, George Swan from Wolverhampton Wanderers, David Tutonda on loan from Cardiff City and Stéphane Zubar on loan from AFC Bournemouth, midfielder James Berrett from Yeovil Town, and strikers Vadaine Oliver from Crewe Alexandra and Reece Thompson from Frickley Athletic. Midfielder Callum Rzonca entered the first-team squad from the youth team after agreeing a professional contract.

New home and away kits were introduced for the second successive summer. The home kit included red shirts with a navy blue diagonal stripe, red shorts and red socks. The away kits featured black shirts with yellow trims on each shoulder and on each side, black shorts with yellow trims on each side and block socks. Benenden Health continued as shirt sponsors for the fourth successive season.

Review

August

York's first match was away to last season's League Two play-off finalists, Wycombe Wanderers, which they lost 3–0. Anthony Stewart opened the scoring with a header before Aaron Amadi-Holloway scored from a low shot, and Zubar scored an own goal when his attempted back-pass lobbed Flinders. York then played League One team Bradford City at home in the first round of the League Cup, and the visitors took the lead in the first half through a Christopher Routis volley. Luke Summerfield equalised with a penalty in the 49th minute, and after Bradford missed a penalty 20 minutes from time, Berrett scored a free kick in the 85th minute. James Hanson headed an equaliser for Bradford in stoppage time, and the match ended 2–2 after extra time. York won the penalty shoot-out 4–2, and Flinders saved two penalties before Carson scored the winning spot kick. York lost 2–1 to Hartlepool United in their first home league match of the season, despite taking the lead in the 57th minute when Thompson scored after Hartlepool failed to clear Summerfield's cross. Billy Paynter curled a shot into the top corner before Michael Woods scored the winner for Hartlepool in the 81st minute, after his miskicked shot took a touch off Berrett.

York picked up their first points of the season after they beat Yeovil Town 1–0 at home, in which Berrett scored in the 63rd minute with a deflected 20-yard shot. This was followed by a 0–0 away draw with Exeter City, in which Zubar was carried off injured. Following the match, Lindon Meikle was released by mutual consent, having failed to make a matchday squad in the first five matches of the season. York were beaten 3–0 away by Swansea City of the Premier League in the League Cup third round, with Nathan Dyer, Matt Grimes and Marvin Emnes scoring their goals. Zubar returned to Bournemouth after he suffered cruciate ligament damage during the Exeter match. Platt was loaned to National League North team Harrogate Town for three months. Thompson gave York a sixth-minute lead with a close-range finish in a home match against Mansfield Town. The away team scored twice later in the first half through Matt Green, and York lost the match 2–1.

September
York achieved their first away win of the season after beating bottom-of-the-table Newport County 3–0. Berrett opened the scoring in the first half with a shot into the bottom corner, and in the second half Thompson scored a header before Oliver scored with a close-range finish. York drew 2–2 away to Stevenage, and took the lead in the 39th minute with a Nolan shot from the edge of the penalty area. Chris Whelpdale and Charlie Lee scored for Stevenage in quick succession early in the second half, and Summerfield equalised with a curling shot on 74 minutes, before Flinders saved a late Brett Williams penalty. Striker Rhys Turner joined on a one-month loan from Oldham Athletic, and made his debut in York's 2–2 home draw with Carlisle United. York were 2–0 down at half-time, before Oliver was sent off for an off-the-ball incident early in the second half. However, within a two-minute period, Summerfield scored a penalty and Carson converted an Emile Sinclair cross to bring the score to 2–2.

York were beaten 1–0 away by Notts County, whose goal came in the 12th minute when Izale McLeod capitalised on a mistake by Flinders. Platt was recalled from his loan at Harrogate, where he made six appearances, after Summerfield sustained back and head injuries in the match against Notts County. York lost 2–1 at home to Oxford United; having gone behind, Turner scored an equaliser after confusion between Sam Slocombe and Johnny Mullins in the penalty area, but the away team scored the winning goal in the second half. Striker Ben Hirst went on a one-month loan to Northern Premier League Division One North club Scarborough Athletic, having had limited chances in the team.

October

Midfielder Michael Collins joined on a one-month loan from Oxford, as cover for the injured Nolan and Summerfield. Michael Coulson scored with a low shot to give York a 50th-minute lead at home to Cambridge United, and John McCombe scored four minutes later with a curling shot to make the score 2–0. However, Mark Roberts and Barry Corr scored for Cambridge in the last 19 minutes, and the match finished a 2–2 draw. York knocked League One team Doncaster Rovers out of the Football League Trophy in the second round with a 2–0 home win. Oliver gave York an early lead with a header into the bottom corner from an Anthony Straker cross, and he doubled the lead early into the second half; after dispossessing Aaron Taylor-Sinclair he lifted the ball over the advancing goalkeeper, Thorsten Stuckmann, before hitting the ball into an empty net. York ended Luton Town's four-match winning streak with a 1–1 away draw; Lowe scored late into the first half with a shot into the top of the goal, before Luton equalised in the second half from a Cameron McGeehan penalty. Turner's loan was extended for a second month. York were beaten 3–1 away by Barnet, who had been on a three-match losing streak. After going behind to John Akinde's goal, Coulson equalised for York in the 80th minute with a drilled shot, but goals in the last 10 minutes from Michael Gash and Josh Clarke secured a win for the home team.

Oliver scored a tap-in to give York a 14th-minute lead at home to Dagenham & Redbridge, before the away team equalised through Ashley Hemmings later in the first half. Jamie Cureton gave Dagenham the lead early in the second half before Coulson scored with a curling shot from 20 yards on 79 minutes, the match finishing a 2–2 draw. York lost 3–1 at home to AFC Wimbledon, who took the lead in the first half through Ade Azeez before Oliver equalised with a bicycle kick in the 60th minute. Lyle Taylor and Tom Elliott scored later in the second half to secure AFC Wimbledon's first successive win of 2015. Wilcox and his assistant John Schofield were sacked with York 21st in the table after a run of nine matches without a win. First-team coach Richard Cresswell took over as caretaker manager, assisted by youth-team coach Jonathan Greening and goalkeeping coach Andy Leaning. Middlesbrough midfielder Bryn Morris, an England youth international, was signed on a one-month loan, and Collins' loan was extended for a second month. Cresswell's first match in charge was a 1–0 away defeat to Crawley Town, who scored in the 86th minute with a Simon Walton penalty.

November

Former Dundee United manager Jackie McNamara was appointed as Wilcox's successor, with Simon Donnelly joining as his assistant. McNamara's first match in charge was a 3–2 away defeat in the FA Cup first round to Accrington Stanley, who took the lead on 29 minutes through Sean McConville, before Oliver equalised for York five minutes later with a close-range finish. Matt Crooks put Accrington back in front two minutes later and Josh Windass scored a penalty early into the second half, before Coulson scored a consolation goal for York with a stoppage time header. York were eliminated from the Football League Trophy after being beaten 2–1 away by Barnsley in the Northern section quarter-final. Coulson opened the scoring for York on 40 minutes with a free kick into the top-left corner, before the League One team scored in the second half through Ben Pearson and Adam Hammill. Greening, who began his career at the club, registered as a player on non-contract terms aged 36, to provide cover with a number of midfielders unavailable. York were beaten 2–1 at home by league leaders Plymouth Argyle, who were two goals up by half-time with goals from Jake Jervis and Graham Carey. Dave Winfield was stretchered off with his neck in a brace during the second half, and Ben Godfrey scored a consolation goal for York during the 10 minutes of stoppage time that followed. Defender Will Boyle, the Huddersfield Town under-21 captain, was signed on a youth loan until January 2016.

York were beaten 3–2 away by Leyton Orient, who took a two-goal lead through Mathieu Baudry and Jay Simpson before Oliver equalised in first-half stoppage time. Orient restored their two-goal advantage through Simpson in the second half, and Oliver scored a consolation goal with a header in the 86th minute. York were beaten 6–0 away by Portsmouth, in which Greening was sent off before half-time for catching Michael Doyle with his elbow, before Ben Davies and Marc McNulty gave the home team the lead early in the second half. McNulty scored two more goals before Ben Tollitt and Conor Chaplin finished the scoring for Portsmouth; this result saw York drop into the relegation zone for the first time in 2015–16. York signed five players before the deadline for loan transfers: defenders Mark Kitching from Middlesbrough and Stefan O'Connor from Arsenal, midfielders Jordan Lussey from Bolton Wanderers and Kenny McEvoy from Tottenham Hotspur, and striker Bradley Fewster from Middlesbrough. Winger Danny Galbraith, released by Gillingham at the end of last season, was signed before the deadline for free transfers. Collins, Morris, Turner and Tutonda were sent back to their parent clubs. York suffered another heavy defeat after losing 5–1 at home to Accrington, who were two goals up at half-time with goals from Matty Pearson and Billy Kee. Josh Windass scored a penalty for Accrington after O'Connor tripped Tom Davies, and Kee scored their fourth before Fewster scored for York with a shot into the bottom corner on 75 minutes. Shay McCartan finished the scoring for Accrington late into the match, and the result meant York equalled a club record of eight straight defeats.

December
Lowe left the club by mutual consent, having earlier been made available for loan by McNamara. Goalkeeping coach Andy Leaning left the club, and was replaced by Craig Hinchliffe, who worked with McNamara at Dundee United. Lussey's loan came to a premature end, after he tore a muscle. York dropped to the bottom of the table after being beaten 2–1 away by Bristol Rovers, in which they took the lead on 41 minutes with an eight-yard volley scored by Oliver. Jermaine Easter equalised for Rovers on 71 minutes, before Matty Taylor scored their winning goal in stoppage time. Cresswell and Greening left the club by mutual consent, while Steve Torpey returned as youth-team coach. York won for the first time in 10 matches after beating Morecambe 2–1 at home, which saw them move out of the relegation zone. Winfield opened the scoring with a header from Berrett's cross on 38 minutes, and Berrett doubled the lead in the 52nd minute with a low shot from the edge of the penalty area, before Jamie Devitt scored a consolation goal for Morecambe two minutes later. York drew 1–1 away to Mansfield, taking the lead on 10 minutes when Winfield touched in Summerfield's free kick, before the home team equalised later in the first half through Krystian Pearce.

January

York dropped to the bottom of the table after being beaten 1–0 away by Yeovil, who in turn moved above York; their goal came from a Matthew Dolan penalty scored late in the first half. Fewster's loan was extended to the end of the season, while McEvoy was signed permanently for the rest of 2015–16. Burnley right-back Luke Hendrie and Newcastle United centre-back Kyle Cameron were signed on one-month loans, while Ntumba Massanka joined on loan from Burnley until the end of the season. Godfrey joined Premier League club Norwich City for an undisclosed fee, believed to be £150,000, with further clauses that could take the figure to £1 million if met. The money was to be invested on strengthening the team, and York immediately replaced Godfrey with Hull City midfielder Matty Dixon, who signed a one-and-a-half-year contract on a free transfer. York lost 1–0 at home to fellow strugglers Newport, who had only appointed their manager Warren Feeney a day earlier. The loss came after Aaron Collins scored in the eighth minute. Marvin McCoy and Straker left the club by mutual consent, while McCombe and Nolan were also offered severance packages.

York drew 1–1 away with Carlisle, who took the lead early in the first half through Jason Kennedy, before Summerfield equalised for York on 87 minutes after Fewster's shot hit the post. Nolan left by mutual consent, before Hendrie had his loan extended to the end of the season. Platt returned to Harrogate on a one-month loan, while Ľubomír Šatka, a Slovakia under-21 international, joined one a one-month youth loan from Newcastle. Former Scotland international striker Derek Riordan, who last played for East Fife, was signed on a contract until the end of the season, after impressing during a two-week trial. York moved within three points of safety after beating Stevenage 2–1 at home, McEvoy scoring the opening goal in the 15th minute with a shot from 12 yards. Keith Keane scored an equaliser for Stevenage on 78 minutes, before Galbraith scored the winning goal in the third minute of stoppage time, with a low shot in off the post from the edge of the penalty area.

February

On transfer deadline day, McCombe left the club after agreeing a severance package, and Sinclair joined National League club Guiseley on a one-month loan. York lost 2–0 away to top-of-the-table Northampton Town, who scored in each half through John-Joe O'Toole and Marc Richards, and had Hendrie sent off for a foul on Ricky Holmes. Cameron's loan was extended until the end of the season, having impressed in his four starts for the club. York won successive home wins for the first time in 2015–16 after they beat Notts County 2–1, a result that saw them move off the bottom of the table into 23rd place. Coulson opened the scoring on 24 minutes after lobbing goalkeeper Roy Carroll from 15 yards before Fewster scored from close range from McEvoy's cross in the 39th minute. County recorded a consolation goal after Šatka scored an own goal in the second half. York moved out of the relegation into 22nd place with a 2–0 home win over Exeter, and in doing so ended the club's longest run without a clean sheet since 1967, after 23 matches. Fewster scored both goals, the first in the 35th minute with a low shot at close range from Coulson's pass, and the second in the 64th minute with a shot from the edge of the penalty area.

York's two-match winning run came to an end after being beaten 3–1 away by Cambridge, who had taken a two-goal lead by the 26th minute through Jimmy Spencer and Josh Coulson. Berrett scored for York seven minutes later with a long-range shot into the top-left corner, before Ben Williamson finished the scoring for Cambridge in the second half. York dropped back into the relegation zone in 23rd place after losing 2–1 at home to Northampton, who took the lead late in the first half through James Collins. John Marquis doubled Northampton's lead early into the second half, and Russell Penn scored a consolation goal for York with a 25-yard dipping volley in the third minute of stoppage time. Huddersfield's Boyle rejoined on loan until the end of the season, while Hare was loaned out to Northern Premier League Premier Division club Stamford for one month. York were beaten 3–2 at home by Luton, Cameron McGeehan giving the visitors the lead early in the second half before Fewster equalised in the 62nd minute after rounding goalkeeper Mark Tyler. After Jack Marriott restored Luton's lead, Fewster scored York's second goal on 82 minutes before Olly Lee scored a solo goal to win the match for the visitors in stoppage time. Šatka's loan from Newcastle was extended to the end of the season. Fewster was named the League Two Player of the Month for February 2016, having scored five goals over the month.

March

York lost 4–0 away to third-place Oxford, in what was only their first home league win of 2016, with a first-half goal from Jordan Bowery and second-half goals from Chey Dunkley, Danny Hylton and Kemar Roofe. Platt and Sinclair's respective loans at Harrogate and Guiseley were extended for a further month. York were beaten 1–0 away by bottom-of-the-table Dagenham, which meant they moved to within two points of York. Penn was sent off in the 57th minute for handling the ball on the goal line, and the resulting Joss Labadie penalty was saved by Flinders, before Dagenham scored the only goal through Josh Passley on 78 minutes. York signed Rochdale striker Lewis Alessandra on a one-month emergency loan and Notts County defender Scot Bennett on loan for the rest of 2015–16, while Massanka was recalled by Burnley. The team drew 1–1 at home with Barnet, which combined with Hartlepoool's win over Dagenham meant York were seven points adrift of safety. Alessandra gave York the lead 20 minutes into his debut with a shot from 10 yards after Jake Hyde hit the post, before Barnet equalised shortly before half-time through Akinde. Rzonca joined Stamford on a one-month loan, with Hare's loan at the club extended to the end of the season.

York were beaten 2–1 away by AFC Wimbledon, and they took the lead in the 38th minute when Penn rebounded in Oliver's blocked shot. Rhys Murphy equalised for AFC Wimbledon on 68 minutes, before Jake Reeves scored with a 30-yard volley in the third minute of stoppage time. Platt's contract with York was terminated by mutual consent, allowing him to join Harrogate permanently. York remained seven points adrift of safety with a 2–2 draw at home to Crawley, who took the lead on five minutes through Matt Harrold before Summerfield equalised for York with a 30th-minute penalty after Alessandra was fouled by Jon Ashton in the penalty area. Liam McAlinden put Crawley back in the lead on 48 minutes, before Coulson scored York's equaliser with a curling 15-yard shot in the 69th minute. York had fallen three goals behind away to promotion-chasing Plymouth by the 42nd minute of a 3–2 defeat, who scored through Jamille Matt, Reuben Reid and a Boyle own goal. Penn brought York back into the match with a drilled shot on 52 minutes, before Summerfield scored a penalty in the 86th minute.

April and May

York moved to being nine points from safety after drawing 1–1 at home to Orient, in which York took the lead in the 17th minute when Fewster converted Summerfield's cross from three yards. Boyle was sent off on 74 minutes after receiving a second yellow card for diving, before Orient equalised a minute later through Lloyd James. Sinclair's loan at Guiseley was extended to the end of the season. York moved closer to relegation after a 1–1 home draw with Wycombe, which left them nine points from safety with five fixtures remaining. York took the lead when Oliver scored his first goal since December 2015 with a 10-yard shot into bottom corner on 35 minutes, before Matt Bloomfield equalised for Wycombe in the 88th minute. Alessandra's loan was extended to the end of the season, after scoring once in six appearances. York were left on the verge of relegation from League Two after a 2–1 away defeat to Hartlepool, with the team 11 points adrift of safety with four fixtures remaining. York went behind on 24 minutes to Nathan Thomas's goal, and 11 minutes later Winfield was sent off for a second yellow card. Cameron equalised for York in first-half stoppage time with a header from Summerfield's corner, before Michael Woods scored Hartlepool's winning goal on 72 minutes.

York won for the first time in 13 matches after beating Portsmouth 3–1 at home, but were left nine points adrift of safety with three matches remaining. Fewster headed York into the lead on 30 minutes and Alessandra scored with a low shot four minutes later. Summerfield made it 3–0 three minutes after half-time with a 30-yard shot, before Portsmouth scored a consolation goal through Gareth Evans in the 55th minute. York's relegation into the National League was confirmed after a 3–0 away defeat to Accrington, marking the end of a four-year spell in the Football League. Promotion-chasing Accrington opened the scoring in the first half through Tariqe Fosu, before Josh Windass scored twice in the second half. York were beaten 4–1 by promotion-chasing Bristol Rovers in their last home match of the season, dropping to the bottom of the table as a result. Billy Bodin scored Rovers' first two goals before Jermaine Easter and Lee Mansell scored either side of McEvoy's 81st-minute goal, a close-range finish from Fewster's low cross from the left. Before the match, Winfield was named the 2015–16 Clubman of the Year, voted for by the club's supporters. York's last match of the season was a 1–1 away draw with Morecambe, in which they took the lead after Summerfield scored in first-half stoppage time, before the home team equalised through Jamie Devitt. This meant York's final league position in 2015–16 was bottom place, being relegated alongside 23rd-place Dagenham.

Summary and aftermath
York released Carson, Hare, Hirst, Femi Ilesanmi, McEvoy, Riordan, Sinclair and Swan after the season ended. Berrett, Coulson, Hyde and Penn left to join Grimsby Town, St Johnstone, Stevenage and Carlisle respectively, while Ingham, Summerfield and Winfield rejected new contracts. Galbraith and Rzonca signed new contracts with the club. York's summer signings have included goalkeeper Luke Simpson from Watford, defenders Ben Barber from Stoke City, Ben Clappison from Hull, Matt Fry from Braintree Town, Jack Higgins from Stalybridge Celtic, Lanre Oyebanjo from Crawley, Josh Robinson from Crusaders, Shaun Rooney from Dunfermline Athletic and Alex Whittle from Southport, midfielders Franklyn Clarke from Dorchester Town, Simon Heslop from Wrexham, Clovis Kamdjo from Forest Green Rovers Yan Klukowski from Newport and Charlie Wardle from Northwich Manchester Villa, wingers Aidan Connolly from Raith Rovers, Kaine Felix and Boston United and Daniel Nti from Worcester City, and strikers Richard Brodie from Stockport County and Scott Fenwick from Hartlepool. Midfielder Tyler Walton and striker Nick Kennedy joined the first-team squad from the youth team after signing professional contracts with the club.

Match details

League Two

League table (part)

FA Cup

League Cup

Football League Trophy

Transfers

In

 Brackets around club names denote the player's contract with that club had expired before he joined York.

Out

 Brackets around club names denote the player joined that club after his York contract expired.

Loan in

Loan out

Appearances and goals
Source:
Numbers in parentheses denote appearances as substitute.
Players with names struck through and marked  left the club during the playing season.
Players with names in italics and marked * were on loan from another club for the whole of their season with York.
Players listed with no appearances have been in the matchday squad but only as unused substitutes.
Key to positions: GK – Goalkeeper; DF – Defender; MF – Midfielder; FW – Forward

See also
List of York City F.C. seasons

References

York City F.C. seasons
York City
Foot